The African Men's Olympic Qualifiers was held to determine the African national teams for under 23 that will participate at the 2004 Summer Olympics football tournament held in Athens.

Preliminary round

|}
 Both withdrew.

First round

|}
 Tunisia bye after both Benin and Equatorial Guinea withdrew.

Second round

Group A

Group B

Group C

Group D

References 

Football qualification for the 2004 Summer Olympics
Football at the Summer Olympics – Men's African Qualifiers